Steve Mason (born May 29, 1988) is a Canadian former professional ice hockey goaltender who is currently the Director of Goalie Development for the Oakville Rangers of the Ontario Minor Hockey Association (OMHA). During his National Hockey League career, he played for the Columbus Blue Jackets, Philadelphia Flyers and Winnipeg Jets.

He was selected 69th overall in the 2006 NHL Entry Draft by the Blue Jackets. Playing major junior in the Ontario Hockey League (OHL), Mason spent three seasons with the London Knights and Kitchener Rangers. In the 2006–07 season, he was named OHL Goaltender of the Year. He joined the Blue Jackets in 2008–09 and won the Calder Memorial Trophy as rookie of the year.

Internationally, he won a gold medal with Team Canada at the 2008 World Junior Championships while earning tournament MVP and Best Goaltender honours.

Playing career
Mason grew up in Oakville, Ontario, playing mostly A hockey until his Bantam year, when he moved up to the AAA level with the Oakville Rangers of the OMHA's South Central AAA League. He was drafted after his minor midget season with Oakville by the London Knights of the OHL in the 11th round of the 2004 OHL Priority Selection.

In 2004–05, while attending Abbey Park High School, he led the Grimsby Peach Kings club to the OHA Jr.C. title in 2004–05 and in 2005–06 was assigned to the Petrolia Jets Jr.B. club when his playing time was limited with London. Despite this, Mason was selected by the Columbus Blue Jackets in the third round, 69th overall, in the 2006 NHL Entry Draft. He started the 2007–08 season with the Blue Jackets, but was returned to London after being a healthy scratch for Columbus' first two games of the season. While competing for Team Canada at the 2008 World Junior Championships, he was traded by the Knights to the Kitchener Rangers on January 4, 2008, hours before the semi-final game.

Upon returning from the World Junior Championships with a gold medal, Mason was briefly recalled by the Blue Jackets on an emergency basis in February, but did not appear in a game and was quickly returned. Mason suffered a knee injury towards the end of the regular season, but with the playoffs approaching, he tried to play through it for several weeks. After defeating the Plymouth Whalers in the first round, Mason was pulled out of the line-up and underwent arthroscopic knee surgery on April 18, forcing him to miss the remainder of the OHL playoffs, as well as the 2008 Memorial Cup. Kitchener won the OHL championship without Mason, but lost 4–1 in the Memorial Cup final against the Spokane Chiefs of the Western Hockey League (WHL).

Columbus Blue Jackets

Before his first professional season, Mason underwent an additional knee surgery in September, causing him to miss the first month of play in the American Hockey League (AHL) with the Blue Jackets' minor league affiliate, the Syracuse Crunch. Shortly after recovering and joining the Crunch's line-up, Mason was called up by the Blue Jackets on November 4, 2008, in the absence of injured starter Pascal Leclaire. He made his NHL debut on November 5, starting against, and defeating, the Edmonton Oilers 5–4. He recorded his first NHL shutout several games later on November 22, making 15 saves in a 2–0 win against the Atlanta Thrashers.

Mason continued to start games upon Leclaire's return from injury and was named NHL Rookie of the Month for November after posting a 5–2–1 record, including three straight wins and two shutouts. In the midst of shutout streak, having not allowed a goal against the Philadelphia Flyers, Los Angeles Kings and Anaheim Ducks, he was named Rookie of the Month for a second-straight month in December. Along with Mason's three straight shutouts, he posted a 7–5–0 record, 1.41 goals against average (GAA) and .950 save percentage for the month. Chosen to play for the rookies at the 2009 NHL YoungStars Game, he opted, however, to skip the competition. It was later revealed on January 30, 2009, by Blue Jackets General Manager Scott Howson that Mason had been suffering from mononucleosis for the previous three-to-four weeks. After three more starts, on February 8, Mason was put on the injured reserve. He returned to the line-up on February 13 against the Detroit Red Wings in a 3–2 Columbus victory. Mason finished the season with a 33–20–7 record, 2.29 GAA and .916 save percentage. For his season's performances, he was awarded the 2009 Calder Memorial Trophy for rookie of the year honours, edging out Kris Versteeg of the Chicago Blackhawks and Bobby Ryan of the Anaheim Ducks in the process. Additionally, on April 27, 2009, the NHL announced that Mason was nominated for the Vezina Trophy as the NHL's top goaltender, along with Tim Thomas of the Boston Bruins and Niklas Bäckström of the Minnesota Wild. Thomas was eventually awarded the trophy.

The next three seasons were a disappointment for Mason, however, as he was unable to duplicate the play of his rookie year, and the Blue Jackets failed to make another playoff appearance.

Philadelphia Flyers
Mason was traded on April 3, 2013, to the Philadelphia Flyers for goaltender Michael Leighton and a 2015 third round draft pick. On April 8, Mason signed a one-year contract extension worth $1.5 million. Mason had four wins and two losses in Philadelphia and posted an impressive 1.90 GAA and a .944 save percentage, leading to speculation that Mason would replace Ilya Bryzgalov as the starter for Philadelphia. In the off-season, on June 25, 2013, Bryzgalov was bought-out by the Flyers, where the team subsequently signed goaltender Ray Emery, effectively promoting Mason to the starter's role. On November 12, 2013, Mason recorded his first shutout for Philadelphia against the Ottawa Senators in a 5–0 win. On January 18, 2014, Mason signed a three-year contract extension with the Flyers worth $12.3 million for an annual average of $4.1 million. Mason finished the 2013-14 season with a 33-18-7 record and a .917 save percentage, which was enough to bring the Flyers to the playoffs. In the playoffs, Mason started 4 games and played in 5, going 2-2 with a 1.97 GAA and a .939 save percentage, but the Flyers were eliminated by the New York Rangers in 7 games.

Winnipeg Jets
On July 1st, 2017, Mason signed a two year deal with the Winnipeg Jets for $4.1 million per year. The plan was for Mason to split the time with young Connor Hellebuyck but his season was de-railed by two concussions
 and a serious knee injury. 

On June 30, 2018, Mason was traded to the Montreal Canadiens along with forward Joel Armia and a few draft picks for  the Canadiens sent him to waivers in order to buy out his contract.  Mason's contract was not picked up by another team, thus making him an unrestricted free agent.

After a lack of interest in the free agent market, Mason opted to retire from playing and return to his hometown of Oakville to serve as the Director of Goalie Development for the Oakville Rangers, a youth team in Oakville.

International play

Mason first competed for Team Canada at the under-20 level in the eight-game 2007 Super Series against Russia.  He then led Team Canada to a gold medal at the 2008 IIHF World Junior Hockey Championships in Pardubice, Czech Republic.  Prior to the semi-final game against Team USA, Mason was traded within the OHL from the London Knights to the Kitchener Rangers.  After defeating Team Sweden 3–2 in overtime of the gold medal game, he was named as the player of the game, as he was in the semi-finals.  Mason was undefeated in five games with a tournament-best .951 save percentage and 1.19 GAA.  He was named to the tournament all-star team, received top goaltender honours, and was named tournament MVP.

Following his rookie NHL season, Mason was named to Team Canada's summer orientation camp for the 2010 Winter Olympics in Vancouver.  He was not named to the final roster, but he was reported to have been designated an injury replacement, along with St. Louis Blues goaltender Chris Mason.

Career statistics

Regular season and playoffs

International

Awards
Junior
Named OHL Goaltender of the Year in 2007.
NHL
Named Rookie of the Month for November and December 2008.
The Sporting News' Rookie of the Year 2009.
Named to the NHL second All-Star team in 2009.
Calder Memorial Trophy winner in 2009.
International
Named Player of the game in the semi-final (against Team USA) and gold medal game (against Sweden) at the 2008 World Junior Championships.
Named to the World Junior all-star team in 2008.
IIHF Best Player Award at the goaltender position at the World Juniors in 2008.
Tournament MVP at the World Juniors in 2008.
Other
Glove save on Craig Adams of the Pittsburgh Penguins voted by Flyers fans as the team's "Highlight of the Year" during the 2014–15 season.

Records
Set the OHL record for regular season wins with 45 in 2006–07 (broken by Andrew Engelage of the Windsor Spitfires with 46 wins in 2008–09)
Set the CHL record for assists by a goaltender with 8 in 2007.

References

External links

 

1988 births
Living people
Calder Trophy winners
Canadian ice hockey goaltenders
Columbus Blue Jackets draft picks
Columbus Blue Jackets players
Ice hockey people from Ontario
Kitchener Rangers players
London Knights players
Manitoba Moose players
Philadelphia Flyers players
Sportspeople from Oakville, Ontario
Syracuse Crunch players
Winnipeg Jets players